The Dandy (EP) by Herman's Hermits is the band's sixth EP and was released in Great Britain by EMI Records, in 1966. This EP recording was produced by Mickie Most, who produced records for such groups as The Animals, Donovan, Suzi Quatro, and The Jeff Beck Group.

Dandy became a hit single in North America in 1966. It reached #1 in Canada on the RPM national singles chart and was #5 in the US for two weeks on the Billboard Hot 100. It also made #3 in New Zealand.

Herman's Hermits consisted of Peter Noone (lead vocals), Karl Green (bass), Keith Hopwood (rhythm guitar), Derek “Lek” Leckenby (lead guitar), and Barry Whitwam (drums).

The title track was written by Ray Davies of The Kinks.

Track listing 
Side 1
"Dandy" (Ray Davies)
"(I Gotta) Dream On" (Gary Gordon)

Side 2
"No Milk Today" (Graham Gouldman)
"For Love" (Keith Hopwood, Derek Leckenby, Harvey Lisberg)

References

External links 

1966 EPs
EMI Records EPs
English male singers
Herman's Hermits albums